The population census in Bulgaria in 1992 was conducted on December 4, by the National Statistical Institute (NSI). It was accompanied by a study of the processes of restitution, privatization and the progress of the agrarian reform. A survey of employment and unemployment was conducted. The census was carried out in accordance with a decision of the National Assembly from 1992.

As of December 4, 1992, the country's population was 8,487,317, of which 4,170,622 (49.1%) were men and 4,316,695 (50.9%) were women. The population in cities was 5,704,552 (67.2%), and in villages it was 2,782,765 (32.8%).

Results

Ethnic composition 

Number and percentage of the population by ethnic group:

Religion 
Number and percentage of the population by religion:

Economic activity 
Population by ethnic group and economic activity:

Education 
Population aged 7 and over by ethnic group and education:

See also 

 Demographics of Bulgaria

References

External links 

1992 in Bulgaria
Censuses in Bulgaria